Sturm is a 1923 World War I novella by the German writer Ernst Jünger. It has a frame story set in the days before the Somme Offensive on the Western Front, where a group of German officers meet to discuss the war and listen to the literary sketches read by one of their members, Lieutenant Sturm.

Publication
Sturm was serialised in Hannoverscher Kurier from 11 to 27 April 1923. The novella was forgotten even by Jünger until it was rediscovered in 1960. It was published in book form in 1963. An English translation by Alexis P. Walker was published by Telos Press Publishing in 2015.

Translations 
 Sturm, Dutch translation by Tinke Davids, De Arbeiderspers, Amsterdam 1984
 Lieutenant Sturm, French translation by Philippe Giraudon, Éditions Viviane Hamy, Paris 1991
 Il tenente Sturm, Italian translation by Alessandra Iadicicco, Guanda, Milano 2001
 Sturm, Swedish translation by Urban Lindström, Bokförlaget Augusti, Lund 2006
 Лейтенант Штурм, Russian translation by Vladimir Mikushevich, Vladimir Dal, St. Petersburg 2010
 El teniente Sturm, Spanish translation by Carmen Gauger, Tusquets Editores, Barcelona 2014
 Sturm, English translation by Alexis P. Walker, Telos Press Publishing, New York 2015
 Sturm, Ukrainian translation by Gleb Parfenov, Dipa, Kiev 2019

References

Further reading
 

1923 German-language novels
1923 German novels
German novellas
Novels by Ernst Jünger
Novels set during World War I